Dança das Cabeças (Portuguese for "Dance of the Heads") is an album by Brazilian composer, guitarist and pianist Egberto Gismonti recorded in 1976 and released on the ECM label. The album was Gismonti's first for the European label, establishing the beginnings of a long and productive association.

Reception
The Allmusic review by Álvaro Neder awarded the album 4 stars, stating, "a landmark of the careers of Gismonti and percussionist Naná Vasconcelos, his only accompanist here. Recorded in only three days, the album's concept is based on the history shared by both musicians, according to Gismonti: two boys wandering through a dense, humid forest, full of insects and animals, keeping a 180-feet distance from each other. The album received several international awards, in England, U.S., Germany, and Brazil. It also changed both artists' lives: Naná immediately became an undisputed international artist, touring worldwide; Egberto returned to Brazil, decided to research Amazon folklore, which would be reflected in his later work. The music is pure and sensitive, challenging and sophisticated, with a broad dynamic range going from haunting, mysterious melodies to full-impact, energetic percussive sounds reminiscent of Brazilian Indians' batuque."

Track listing
All compositions by Egberto Gismonti except as indicated
Part I  – 25:21
"Quarto Mundo No. 1"
"Dança das Cabeças"
"Águas Luminosas" (D. Bressane)
"Celebração de Núpcias"
"Porta Encantada"
"Quarto Mundo No. 2"
Part II – 24:30
"Tango" (Gismonti, G. E. Carneiro)
"Bambuzal"
"Fé Cega, Faca Amolada" (Milton Nascimento, R. Bastos)
"Dança Solitária"

Recorded at Talent Studio in Oslo, Norway in November 1976

Personnel
 Egberto Gismonti - 8-string guitar, piano, wood flutes, voice
 Naná Vasconcelos - percussion, berimbau, corpo, voice

References

1977 albums
ECM Records albums
Albums produced by Manfred Eicher
Egberto Gismonti albums
Naná Vasconcelos albums